In a synthetic environment, Synthetic Psychological Environment (SPE) (or rules of behavior) refers to the representation (i.e. modeling) of influences to individuals and groups as a result of culture (e.g. demography, law, religion)).

Synonyms
SPE is known by many names including:

 Cultural factors
 Cultural modeling
 Human Terrain
 Non-kinetic Effects
 Political, Military, Economic, Social, Information, and Infrastructure (PMESII)

Models
A few models that represent aspects of SPE are:

 Joint Non-Kinetic Effects Model (JNEM)
 Simulation of Cultural Identities for Prediction of Reactions (SCIPR)
 Minerva Model (i.e. from Minerva Project)
 Integrated Gaming System (IGS)
 Synthetic Environment for Analysis and Simulations (SEAS)

See also

 Glossary of military modeling and simulation
 Human Terrain System
 Human Terrain Team
 Modeling and simulation

References

Military terminology
Synthetic environment